Karen Davidson is a British former wheelchair athlete. Davidson was a force in the London Marathon women's wheelchair race during the mid-1980s. She was the runner-up in 1986, won the race setting new course and British records in 1987, and retained her title in 1988 while setting another British record. She competed in both athletics and swimming at the 1984 Summer Paralympics, taking a gold medal in the shot put A1, silver in discus A1, bronze in javelin A1, and another bronze in the pool in the 200 metre individual medley A1. She participated in athletics again at the 1988 Games, but did not medal. Karen was a member of Rugby Sport for the Disabled Association.

References

External links
 

Year of birth missing (living people)
Living people
British female wheelchair racers
Paralympic athletes of Great Britain
Athletes (track and field) at the 1984 Summer Paralympics
Athletes (track and field) at the 1988 Summer Paralympics
Paralympic swimmers of Great Britain
Swimmers at the 1984 Summer Paralympics
Paralympic gold medalists for Great Britain
Paralympic silver medalists for Great Britain
Paralympic bronze medalists for Great Britain
British female medley swimmers
Paralympic wheelchair racers
Medalists at the 1984 Summer Paralympics
Paralympic medalists in athletics (track and field)
Paralympic discus throwers
Paralympic javelin throwers
Paralympic shot putters
Wheelchair discus throwers
Wheelchair javelin throwers
Wheelchair shot putters
21st-century British women